In baseball, the pitch is the act of throwing the baseball toward home plate to start a play. The term comes from the Knickerbocker Rules. Originally, the ball had to be thrown underhand, much like "pitching in horseshoes". Overhand pitching was not allowed in baseball until 1884.

The biomechanics of pitching have been studied extensively. The phases of pitching include the windup, early cocking, late cocking, early acceleration, late acceleration, deceleration, and follow-through.

Pitchers throw a variety of pitches, each of which has a slightly different velocity, trajectory, movement, hand position, wrist position and/or arm angle. These variations are introduced to confuse the batter and ultimately aid the defensive team in getting the batter or baserunners out. To obtain variety, and therefore enhance defensive baseball strategy, the pitcher manipulates the grip on the ball at the point of release. Variations in the grip cause the seams to catch the air differently, thereby changing the trajectory of the ball, making it harder for the batter to hit.

The selection of which pitch to use can depend on a wide variety of factors including the type of hitter who is being faced; whether there are any base runners; how many outs have been made in the inning; and the current score. Pitchers may bounce their pitches in the dirt before they reach the batter, but these pitches are called balls even if they pass through the strike zone.

Signaling
The responsibility for selecting the type of pitch is traditionally made by the catcher, who gives hand signals to the pitcher with their fingers, usually one finger for fastball or the pitcher's best pitch, with the pitcher having the option to ask for another selection by shaking his head.

Alternatively, the manager or a coach relays the pitch selection to the catcher, via secret hand signals, to prevent the opposing team from having the advantage of knowing what the next pitch will be.

Fastballs

The fastball is the most common pitch in baseball, and most pitchers have some form of a fastball in their arsenal. Most pitchers throw four-seam fastballs. It is basically a pitch thrown very fast, generally as hard as a given pitcher can throw while maintaining control. Some variations involve movement or breaking action, some do not and are simply straight, high-speed pitches. While throwing the fastball it is very important to have proper mechanics, because this increases the chance of getting the ball to its highest velocity, making it difficult for the opposing player to hit the pitch.  The cut fastball, split-finger fastball, and forkball are variations on the fastball with extra movement, and are sometimes called sinking-fastballs because of the trajectories.  The most common fastball pitches are:

 Cutter
 Four-seam fastball
 Sinker
 Split-finger fastball
 Two-seam fastball

Breaking balls

Well-thrown breaking balls have movement, usually sideways or downward.  A ball moves due to the changes in the pressure of the air surrounding the ball as a result of the kind of pitch thrown. Therefore, the ball keeps moving in the path of least resistance, which constantly changes. For example, the spin from a properly thrown slider (thrown by a right-handed pitcher) results in lower air pressure on the pitcher's left side, resulting in the ball moving to the left (from the pitcher's perspective). The goal is usually to make the ball difficult to hit by confusing the batters.  Most breaking balls are considered off-speed pitches. The most common breaking pitches are:

 12–6 curveball
 Curveball
 Knuckle curve
 Screwball
 Slider
 Slurve

Changeups

The changeup is an off-speed pitch, usually thrown to look like a fastball but arriving much slower to the plate. Its reduced speed coupled with its deceptive delivery is meant to confuse the batter's timing. It is thrown the same as a fastball, but simply farther back in the hand, which makes it release from the hand slower but still retaining the look of a fastball. A changeup is generally thrown 8–15 miles per hour slower than a fastball. If thrown correctly, the changeup will confuse the batter because the human eye cannot discern that the ball is coming significantly slower until it is around 30 feet from the plate. For example, a batter swings at the ball as if it was a 90 mph fastball but it is coming at 75 mph which means he is swinging too early to hit the ball well, making the changeup very effective. The most common changeups are:

 Circle changeup
 Forkball
 Fosh
 Palmball
 Straight changeup
 Vulcan changeup

Other pitches
Other pitches which are or have been used in baseball are:

 Gyroball
 Junk pitches
 Eephus pitch
 Knuckleball
 Shuuto
 Illegal pitches
 Beanball
 Emery ball
 Shine ball
 Spitball
 Purpose pitches
 Brushback pitch
 Pickoff
 Pitchout

Pitching deliveries
The most common pitching delivery is the three-quarters delivery. Other deliveries include the submarine (underhand) and the sidearm deliveries. There is also the crossfire pitch, which only works for sidearm delivery.

A pickoff move is the motion the pitcher goes through in making pickoff.

Pitching positions

There are two legal pitching positions:
the windup
the set which is often referred to as the stretch.
Typically, pitchers from the set use a high leg kick, but may instead release the ball more quickly by using the slide step.

See also 

 First-pitch strike
 Bowling – pitching a cricket ball
 Throwing (cricket), a type of bowling more similar to baseball pitching
 Pitch (softball)

References

External links 
 

 
Baseball terminology
Articles containing video clips